Shane Barnett (born July 4, 1986) is an American politician who has served in the Mississippi House of Representatives from the 86th district since 2016.

In 2020, Barnett voted no on the bill to change the Mississippi State Flag.

References

1986 births
Living people
Republican Party members of the Mississippi House of Representatives
21st-century American politicians